Dilli Ram Thapa is a Bharatiya Janata Party politician from Sikkim. He has been elected in Sikkim Legislative Assembly election in 2019 from Upper Burtuk constituency as candidate of Sikkim Democratic Front but later he joined Bharatiya Janata Party.

References 

Living people
Bharatiya Janata Party politicians from Sikkim
Sikkim MLAs 2019–2024
Sikkim Democratic Front politicians
Year of birth missing (living people)
People from Gangtok